was a British-Japanese international lawyer, diplomat, legal adviser of the Japanese Ambassador to London, member of Middle Temple and founder of Chuo University.

Biography 
His first name 'Rokuichiro' was given to him because his father was 61 years when he was born, the roku-ju-ichi means 61 in Japanese.

He graduated in law school later before his fellow Chuo University founders, he also graduated from University of Tokyo in 1879 in the Law School after his talent was recognized by the founder of  Mitsubishi Yataro Iwasaki, took him to England there he started Middle Temple in 1881 to 1883 during the year entrance fees were £50 in addition, he was asked to pay £100 which would be reimbursed when he had become barrister. This £100 was used for grant for employment as barrister in Inns of Court, after he was required to attend four schools semester in one year although the schooling term consists of dinner at the cafeteria of Inns Court and listening to the reading of books on a statutory law at either times of the dinners and active debate regarding legal issues and current events. He passed the required school terms written oral examination which is held in Lincoln's Inn cafeteria, the largest of the four schools. He was called to the Bar at Middle Temple in 1883 and moved back to Japan, he was one of the first Japanese to become a barrister in England.

He retired from the field of education and began to practice law. Masujima worked as a public relations lawyer, mainly dealing with public relations litigation cases and corporate law. His achievements and fame led to him being given honorary membership of the Canadian Bar Association and the New York State Bar Association. His office expanded from Tokyo to Yokohama, Kobe and Shanghai.

In 1934, Masujima founded the Sei-Kiu-Do Common Law Library, later called the Sei-Kiu-Do Common Law Institute, originally located on his lands in the middle of Tokyo. His motivation was to develop a central theory of law that offered justice. At the time Japanese law was governed by a mixture of customary law, German civil code and part of the English law merchant.

At some point during the 1930s, Masujima met Martin Taylor, President of the New York State Bar Association, on the deck of an Atlantic transport liner, which was waiting for the tide in the Thames. A strong friendship developed between the two men, which led to the setting up of the Common Law Foundation in America.

At the outbreak of the Second World War, Masujima was unable to return to Japan for two years. The Sei-Kiu-Do Common Law Library suffered greatly from bomb damage. After the war, Anglo-American Law Research became popular in Japan and his library was deposited in the Supreme Court of Japan in 1949, after his death.

Chuo University establishment 

In 1885 Rokuichiro Masujima led some fellow 18 young attorneys to established the English law school as a research institute focusing Anglo-American Common Law which in 1905 was later renamed to “Chuo University” and it began operating as an college for legal, financial and political field. The word 'Chuo' is said to be derived from a Japanese words “Chuo Ho-in” translated in English as Legal Training Institution Middle Temple where together with the other co-founder of Chuo University studies in England.

After the establishment of Chuo, he became the first director of the institution.

Notes 

1857 births
1948 deaths
People from Tokyo
Members of the Middle Temple
19th-century Japanese lawyers
20th-century Japanese lawyers